Brian Bedford  may refer to:

 Brian Bedford (1935–2016), English actor
 Brian Bedford (footballer) (1933–2022), Welsh footballer
 Brian Bedford (gridiron football) (born 1965), American football wide receiver
 Brian Bedford (songwriter), English songwriter (Artisan)